Hilaroleopsis vogti is a species of beetle in the family Cerambycidae. It was described by Lane in 1970. It is known from Guatemala.

References

Hemilophini
Beetles described in 1970